Taher is a district in Jijel Province, Algeria. It was named after its capital, Taher. It is one of the largest districts of the province, in area, population, and population density.

Municipalities
The district is further divided into 5 municipalities:
Taher
 Boucif Ouled Askeur
 Chahna
 El Amir Abdelkader
 Ouadjana

Notes

External links
 Jijel news